Joyce Ann Wainaina, is a Managing Director of Citibank and serves as the Head of Citi’s Global Network Banking across Sub Sahara Africa. She is a Kenyan corporate executive, who previously served as the chief executive officer, of Citibank Kenya and East Africa, from 2014 - 2019 where she was the regional executive director of Citibank subsidiaries in Kenya, Tanzania, Uganda & Zambia.

Background and education
She was born in Kenya in December 1967, and attended local primary and secondary schools. She was awarded a Bachelor of Science in Finance by Duquesne University, in Pennsylvania, United States. She also holds a Master of Science in Financial Economics, from the School of Oriental and African Studies, at the University of London.

Career
Joyce-Ann Wainaina is Head of Global Network Banking for Citi Sub Sahara Africa, covering 11 countries in South, East, West and Central Africa.
She has an extensive career with Citi starting in 1990 and has held senior positions across Africa covering country management, corporate banking, product management, operations and controls. Joyce-Ann was previously the CEO for Citi East Africa for 5 years. Prior to that she was the Managing Director and Chief Country Officer (CCO) of Citibank Zambia, from 2011 to 2014. 
Joyce-Ann is passionate about developing talent in Africa; she co-designed the Sapphire Leadership Programme a mentoring program for senior talent development in Citi across Emerging Markets in EMEA. She also partnered with the Kenya Bankers Association and the Central Bank of Kenya to establish a mentorship program for Women Leaders in the Banking industry in Kenya. She is a founding Trustee of the JB Wanjui Education Trust focused on providing grants to girls in university in Kenya.
.

Family
Ms Joyce Ann Wainaina is a married mother of three children.

Other responsibilities
As of March 2019, Joyce Ann Wainaina was one of the five women who served as CEOs of Kenyan commercial banks. The other four are (a) Nasim Devji, at Diamond Trust Bank (b) Betty Korir at Credit Bank (c) Anne Karanja, at Kenya Post Office Savings Bank and (d) Rebecca Mbithi at Family Bank

See also
 Economy of Kenya
 List of banks in Tanzania
 List of banks in Africa

References

External links
 Webpage of Citibank Kenya

1967 births
Living people
Kenyan bankers
20th-century Kenyan businesswomen
20th-century Kenyan businesspeople
21st-century Kenyan businesswomen
21st-century Kenyan businesspeople
Duquesne University alumni
Alumni of SOAS University of London